Kněževes is a market town in Rakovník District in the Central Bohemian Region of the Czech Republic. It has about 1,000 inhabitants.

Geography
It lies in an agricultural landscape in the Rakovník Uplands.

History
The first written mention of Kněževes is from 1327, in a deed of King John of Bohemia for the Teplá Abbey. The village was located on a trade route from Prague to Cheb. In 1685, the Waldstein family purchased Kněževes from the royal chamber. After Jan Josef Waldstein died in 1733, the village was inherited by his daughter Marie Anna, who married Josef Wilhelm, Count of Fürstenberg. The Fürstenberg family then owned Kněževes until the establishment of an independent municipality in 1850.

Kněževes was predominantly an agricultural village. In the second half of the 19th century, it became known as the second most important hop growing locality in the country (after Žatec). In 1897, Kněževes was promoted to a market town by Emperor Franz Joseph I.

Economy
Kněževes lies in the Žatec Hop Region. The hop growing continues here to this day.

Transport
The I/6 road, part of the European route E48, passes through the municipality. It replaces the unfinished section of the D6 motorway from Prague to Karlovy Vary.

Sights
The main landmark of Kněževes is the Church of Saint James the Great. The original church was first mentioned in 1318. After it was destroyed by fire in 1718, it was replaced by the current Baroque building in 1721, designed by the architect František Maxmilián Kaňka.

References

External links

Market towns in the Czech Republic